IRB Sougueur Caravane, or IRB Sougueur for short, is an Algerian football club based in the city of Sougueur in northwestern Algeria. The club was founded in 1943 and currently plays in the Inter-Régions Division.

League participation
Algerian Championnat National 2: 2002–2004
Inter-Régions Division: 2009–2011

Stadium
Currently the team plays at the Stade IRBS.

Former players
  Okacha Hamzaoui
  Abdelkrim Laribi 
  Rafik Saïfi

References

External links
Loghi calcio
IRB_Sougueur.bmp
Stade IRBS
Leprincebonnois

Football clubs in Algeria
Association football clubs established in 1943
1943 establishments in Algeria
Sports clubs in Algeria